Adam Gabriel (born 28 March 2001) is a Czech footballer who plays as a right back for Hradec Králové.

Club career
Gabriel began his career in the youth ranks at SK Zbraslav, before moving to Sparta Prague. On 10 August 2021, Gabriel made his debut for Sparta Prague, coming on as an 84th-minute substitute in the UEFA Champions League against Monaco.

On 30 May 2022, Gabriel signed for Hradec Králové, with Jan Mejdr going in the opposite direction.

International career
Gabriel has represented the Czech Republic at under-19 and under-21 level.

Personal life
Gabriel and his twin, Šimon, are sons of former Czech Republic international Petr Gabriel.

References

2001 births
Living people
Czech footballers
Association football defenders
AC Sparta Prague players
Czech First League players
Czech Republic youth international footballers
Czech Republic under-21 international footballers
FC Hradec Králové players